is a private junior college in Nishihara, Okinawa, Japan. It was established in 1959 as a junior college for United States Civil Administration of the Ryukyu Islands, the predecessor of the school was founded in 1957. In 1972 it was changed to native college.

In 1984 Rupert Bruce-Mitford found it necessary to sell his library, which went to Okinawa Christian Junior College.

Academic departments 
 English studies
 Child care studies
 Christianity studies

Advanced course 
 No

See also 
 List of junior colleges in Japan
 Okinawa Christian University

External links

References

Japanese junior colleges
Educational institutions established in 1959
Private universities and colleges in Japan
Universities and colleges in Okinawa Prefecture
1959 establishments in Okinawa